A constitutional referendum was held in Sierra Leone on 12 July 1978. The constitutional amendments were aimed at turning the country into a presidential one-party state, with the All People's Congress as the sole legal party. The new constitution had been adopted by Parliament in May, and was put to public approval in the referendum. With more than 97% of voters voting in favour according to official results, the referendum has been described as "heavily rigged".

APC leader and President Siaka Stevens had pushed for the adoption of one-party rule, contending that it was more "African" than Western-style democracy.

Results

Aftermath
Following the referendum, Stevens was sworn in for another seven-year term. In the next presidential elections in 1985, voters had the choice of supporting or opposing his successor, Joseph Saidu Momoh, with no opposition candidates allowed. The 15 Sierra Leone People's Party MPs elected in 1977 joined the APC.

The country would remain a one-party state until 1991, when a referendum repealed the 1978 constitution and returned the country to multi-party politics.

References

Sierra Leone
Referendums in Sierra Leone
1978 in Sierra Leone
Constitutional referendums